The fourth and final series of The Green Green Grass  originally aired between 8 January 2009 and 5 March 2009, beginning with the episode "The Path of True Love".

Outline
The series continued to feature the seven main characters that appeared in series one.

Samantha Sutherland's character, Sara, who was Tyler's girlfriend, was a regular throughout the series before as was Llewellyn (Alan David) and Ray (Nigel Harrison).

Episodes

Production
The series was produced by Shazam Production, a company that produces comedies by John Sullivan. The series was filmed at Teddington Studios, with a live audience. All episodes in the first series were directed by Dewi Humphreys. This particular series was written by Jim Sullivan, John Sullivan, Keith Lindsay, David Cantor, Robert Evans, Gary Lawson and John Phelps.

Reception

Viewers
The series began airing on Thursday evenings, at 20:30. The series slumped slightly with viewers, with the first episode, "The Path of True Love" gaining 4.07 million viewers, which was not in the top thirty highest ratings. Ratings then fell for the next two episodes before rising for the fourth episode then dropping again for the next two episodes and then rising again for the last two episodes of the series.

Critics
The series continued receive negative reviews from critics and some fans of Only Fools and Horses as well but a few positive reviews beginning to make their way to the surface. The series did not manage to reach the five million mark but did manage to beat fellow comedies, Not Going Out and The Old Guys.

References

External links
The Green Green Grass Official website
The Green Green Grass BBC Comedy
The Green Green Grass British TV Comedy
The Green Green Grass British Sitcom Guide
The Green Green Grass Only Fools and Horses
 

2009 British television seasons
The Green Green Grass